Bovaki (also Romanized as Bovakī, Bauki, Bāvakī, and Bāvkī; also known as ‘Alī Āqā and Būk) is a village in Pachehlak-e Sharqi Rural District, in the Central District of Aligudarz County, Lorestan Province, Iran. At the 2006 census, its population was 451, in 78 families.

References 

Towns and villages in Aligudarz County